Bundi Rural LLG is a local-level government (LLG) of Madang Province, Papua New Guinea.

Wards
01. Bundi-kara
02. Snopass
03. Bononi
04. Imuri
05. Gobug-Agu
06. Yandara
07. Kindaukevi
08. Karamuke
09. Marum
10. Mokinangi
11. Guyebi
12. Emegari
13. Kobum
14. Mondinongra
15. Pupuneri
16. Biom
17. Promisi
18. Brahman
19. Tauya
20. Safi
21. Pendiva
22. Krumbukari

Climate
Bundi has a tropical rainforest climate (Af) with heavy rainfall year-round.

References

Local-level governments of Madang Province